Rooney Eva Wankewai (born 25 December 1996) is a Cameroon professional footballer who plays as a striker for Turan-Tovuz in Azerbaijan Premier League.

Career
Born in Douala, Cameroon. Rooney started his career in APEJES Academy in Cameroon. After a successful season with APEJAS, he got a call for Cameroon U17 team camp for African U17 Championship.

Asteras Tripoli
In August 2017, Rooney signed a 3-year deal with one of the top Greek side Asteras Tripoli.

Trikala
On 31 August 2018, he signed a contract with Trikala on a free transfer.

MC Alger
In July 2019, he signed a contract with MC Alger on a free transfer.

References

External links
 

1996 births
Living people
Footballers from Douala
Cameroonian footballers
Cameroon international footballers
Cameroonian expatriate footballers
Cameroonian expatriate sportspeople in Algeria
Cameroonian expatriate sportspeople in Greece
Expatriate footballers in Greece
Expatriate footballers in Algeria
Super League Greece players
Elite One players
Super League Greece 2 players
Football League (Greece) players
Algerian Ligue Professionnelle 1 players
Trikala F.C. players
Asteras Tripolis F.C. players
AO Chania F.C. players
Agrotikos Asteras F.C. players
Veria F.C. players
Apollon Pontou FC players
Aittitos Spata F.C. players
MC Alger players
AS Aïn M'lila players
A.E. Karaiskakis F.C. players
APEJES Academy players
Association football forwards